James Ransom McWane (August 15, 1869 – June 24, 1933) was an American industrialist and founder of Birmingham-based McWane, Inc., one of the largest manufacturers of cast iron pipes in North America.

McWane was born in Virginia, where his father operated a foundry business. An 1891 graduate of Bethany College, he was recruited by the Birmingham Steel and Iron Company and moved to Alabama in 1903. The following year, he oversaw the construction of Vulcan, the largest cast iron statue in the world, for the 1904 World's Fair in St. Louis, Missouri. In 1908, McWane joined John Eagan's ACIPCO as a senior executive. He became the firm's president in 1915, and was responsible for much of its modernization and expansion until he was forced out by Eagan in 1921. Afterwards, McWane opened his own pipe foundry in Birmingham. It was the Roaring Twenties, and it quickly became successful, adding a second facility in Utah in 1926. McWane moved to a stately home in Mountain Brook in 1929. He also became a trustee of Lynchburg College in Virginia. While on business in Chicago, he died from a heart attack, in 1933.

References

External links
 NY Times: A Family's Fortune, a Legacy of Blood and Tears. January 2003
 PBS Frontline: A Dangerous Business Revisited. February 2008

1869 births
1933 deaths
American company founders
Bethany College (West Virginia) alumni
People from Wytheville, Virginia
People from Mountain Brook, Alabama